Happy Holidays was a British television mini-series aired on the BBC during 1954. Its cast included Hattie Jacques, John Le Mesurier, Clive Dunn, Carole Lorimer, Colin Campbell, Robert Scroggins, and Anthony Lang. Although telerecording existed, none of the episodes remain in the archives.

References

External links

1954 British television series debuts
1954 British television series endings
Lost BBC episodes
English-language television shows
1950s British television miniseries
Black-and-white British television shows